Brian Christopher Rafalski (born September 28, 1973) is an American former professional ice hockey defenseman. He played in the National Hockey League (NHL) for the New Jersey Devils and Detroit Red Wings, in the SM-liiga for HPK and HIFK, in the Elitserien for Brynäs IF, and in the ECHL for the Florida Everblades.

After failing to enter the NHL, Rafalski spent four seasons in Europe - winning the Finnish SM-liiga with HIFK in 1998. After Entering the NHL in 1999 with the New Jersey Devils, Rafalski was part of 3 Stanley Cup Championship teams with the New Jersey Devils in 2000 and 2003; and with the Detroit Redwings in 2008. In total he played in five Stanley Cup finals in his NHL career (2000, 2001, 2003, 2008, 2009). Rafalski also played for the United States national team in three Olympic ice hockey tournaments (2002, 2006, and 2010).

Playing career

Amateur
As a youth, Rafalski played in the 1987 Quebec International Pee-Wee Hockey Tournament with a minor ice hockey team from Detroit.

Rafalski played for the Madison Capitols of the United States Hockey League (USHL). In 47 games during the 1990–91 season he scored 23 points with 12 goals and 11 assists.

College and European play
Rafalski played for four years at the University of Wisconsin–Madison and was a proficient player, scoring 45 points in 43 games in his senior year with the Badgers. He won several awards that season — he was named to the WCHA First All-Star Team, the NCAA West All-Star Team and the WCHA Defenseman of the Year. With no immediate NHL prospects, however, Rafalski travelled overseas, spending the 1995–96 season with Brynäs IF of the Swedish Elitserien.

After scoring only nine points in 22 games in Sweden, he then moved to Finland to play a season for HPK of the SM-liiga, scoring 35 points. He then moved to HIFK in 1997, where he spent two successful years. In his final year in Finland, he scored 19 goals and 53 points in 53 games, and won the Kultainen kypärä, awarded to the top SM-liiga player of the season, as voted by fellow players. Notably, he also became the first non-Finnish player to win the award.

NHL career

New Jersey Devils

Rafalski was named by Sporting News in 1999 as the best hockey player in the world not playing in the NHL. On May 7, 1999, Rafalski was signed by the New Jersey Devils as a free agent at the age of 25 to start the 1999–2000 season.

Immediately after arriving in New Jersey, Rafalski was partnered on defense with Devils captain Scott Stevens. The two would remain as mainstay defensive partners for five years, until Stevens' retirement in 2004. Rafalski finished his rookie season with 32 points and led all rookie defensemen in plus-minus with a +21 rating, second among Devils defensemen and tied for first amongst all rookie players. Rafalski helped the Devils win the Stanley Cup that year and along with Calder Memorial Trophy-winning teammate Scott Gomez, he was named to the NHL All-Rookie Team.

Rafalski improved his production in his sophomore season, scoring 52 points. His 18 points during the 2001 playoffs set a team record for defensemen, although the Devils lost to the Colorado Avalanche in the Finals.

In the 2001–02 season, Rafalski continued his scoring pace, registering 47 points. He was selected to participate in the National Hockey League All-Star Game, but was forced to sit out due to injury. The next season, he once again led all Devils defensemen in scoring, with 40 points. He was a vital part of a Devils defense that helped the team win the Stanley Cup again in a seven-game series win over the Mighty Ducks of Anaheim in June 2003.

Detroit Red Wings

On July 1, 2007, the Detroit Red Wings signed Rafalski to a $30 million, five-year contract as an unrestricted free agent. Rafalski had grown up in nearby Dearborn, Michigan, and had been a Red Wings fan growing up. He was teamed with another legendary defenseman, Nicklas Lidström.

Rafalski set a career high in goals (11) after scoring against the St. Louis Blues on March 5, 2008. He would go on to score 13 goals for the season, amassing that amount in 73 games. On June 4, 2008, Rafalski helped lead the Red Wings to the Stanley Cup over the Pittsburgh Penguins, Rafalski's third Cup victory. He helped the cause by scoring the first Red Wings goal on the power play in the first period of Game 6 to help Detroit edge Pittsburgh 3–2.

On January 1, 2009, Rafalski scored the game-winning goal for the Red Wings in the 2009 Winter Classic, the first NHL game played outdoors in Red Wings history. The Red Wings defeated the Chicago Blackhawks, 6–4.

On May 5, 2009, Red Wings Head Coach Mike Babcock announced that Rafalski would miss Game 3 of the Western Conference Semi-Finals. It was the first time Rafalski missed the first three games of a series. Rafalski finished the 2009 Stanley Cup playoffs with three goals and nine assists as the Red Wings came within a game of repeating as Stanley Cup champions, falling to the Pittsburgh Penguins.

On May 25, 2011, Rafalski announced his retirement from the NHL, walking away from the final year of his contract, citing knee and back injuries. Because Rafalski retired on an under-35 contract without being bought out, the move removed his cap hit for the  season.

In the 11 NHL seasons that Rafalski played, his team qualified for the Stanley Cup playoffs every year. Consequently, Rafalski led all NHL players in playoff games played during the 2000s decade, with 142.

On January 3, 2014, the Florida Everblades of the ECHL signed Rafalski to a contract, his first return to professional hockey since his initial retirement. He expressed a desire to return to the NHL, but was released 18 days after he signed, once again citing back issues.

International play

Rafalski represented Team USA at the 2002 Winter Olympics, winning a silver medal as the U.S. lost to Canada in the finals.

Rafalski continued to represent the U.S. in international play, playing in both the 2004 World Cup of Hockey and the 2006 Winter Olympics.

Rafalski also played in the 2010 Winter Olympics, serving as alternate captain. He scored two goals and assisted on another in Team USA's 5–3 win over Canada in group-stage play, which ensured the United States would win their group and earn a bye to the quarter-finals. He finished third in the tournament in scoring (first among defensemen) with four goals and four assists. He was also named as the best defenseman of the tournament, as well as being named to the tournament all-star team. Unfortunately, his defensive mistake led to Canada's tournament-winning goal in overtime of the gold medal game.

Awards and honors

 Best Defenseman of the 2010 Olympic hockey tournament
 All-star selection of the 2010 Olympic hockey tournament
 Inducted into the United States Hockey Hall of Fame (2014)

Personal life
Rafalski and his wife Felicity have three sons — Danny, born in June 1997; Evan, born in October 2000; and Matthew, born in June 2004.

Rafalski has a degree from the University of Wisconsin–Madison in Economics. He has stated that he frequently listens to Glenn Beck.

Speaking about his retirement, Rafalski said, "This was probably the most challenging season of my career, both physically, mentally and spiritually, but it was also the most rewarding and most blessed...The decision was made between myself and my wife approximately two months ago. We went through a long process of weighing different factors in our lives. At the end of the day it came down to priorities, with the top three priorities being serving God, serving my family and serving others."

Rafalski currently resides in Waupaca, Wisconsin with his family.

Career statistics

Regular season and playoffs

International

References

External links
 
 Rafalski's U.S. Olympic Team bio

1973 births
Living people
American men's ice hockey defensemen
American people of Polish descent
Brynäs IF players
Detroit Red Wings players
Florida Everblades players
HIFK (ice hockey) players
HPK players
Ice hockey players from Michigan
Ice hockey players at the 2002 Winter Olympics
Ice hockey players at the 2006 Winter Olympics
Ice hockey players at the 2010 Winter Olympics
Madison Capitols players
Medalists at the 2002 Winter Olympics
Medalists at the 2010 Winter Olympics
National Hockey League All-Stars
New Jersey Devils players
Olympic silver medalists for the United States in ice hockey
Sportspeople from Dearborn, Michigan
People from Verona, New Jersey
Stanley Cup champions
Undrafted National Hockey League players
United States Hockey Hall of Fame inductees
Wisconsin Badgers men's ice hockey players
AHCA Division I men's ice hockey All-Americans
American expatriate ice hockey players in Finland
American expatriate ice hockey players in Sweden